Bestway Wholesale Limited is the second largest food wholesaler in the UK. It trades from 62 warehouses and is a supply partner to over 70,000 independent retailers and 40,000 catering and foodservice operators. Bestway Wholesale also operates the Best-one symbol group which has 1,400 members throughout the country. Over 3,500 independents have chosen their depot-run promotional club, Xtra Local, as their retail club of choice. Bestway Wholesale is part of the Bestway Group.

History
Bestway Wholesale was established in 1976.

In January 2005 Bestway Group Chief Executive Zameer Choudrey CBE led the acquisition of Batleys plc for £100 million.  An OFT report published soon after the acquisition stated  that the merged entity is the fourth largest national grocery wholesaler in the UK, with a 9.9% share of supply in grocery wholesaling as a whole and 15.9% share of supply in cash & carry alone.

Batleys contributed towards expanding the Group's market share by 50%. In addition to organic growth over the years, the Group acquired Bellevue Cash & Carry's two warehouses in Edinburgh and Stirling in June 2010. In November 2010 the Group went on to acquire the Martex Group of three cash & carry warehouses and its food service operation from C J Lang.

In April 2014, the Group acquired Glasgow-based wholesaler Sher Brothers and merged Sher Brothers into the Batleys brand.

In April 2018, the company purchased the assets and brands of Conviviality Retail from administrators PwC for £7.25m. PwC partner Matthew Callaghan said: ‘This deal safeguards the jobs of more than 2,000 employees. 

In June 2018, the company acquired two Blakemore Wholesale's warehouses in Cardiff and Walsall.

In December 2020, the company acquired symbol operator Costcutter Supermarkets Group for an undisclosed fee from Bibby Line Group. The Costcutter operations initially become part of Bestway's retail arm. This will involve the integration of around 1,500 stores branded Costcutter, Mace, Supershop, Kwiksave and Simply Fresh, along with 20 Costcutter and four Co-op franchise stores.

See also
 Bestway 
 Costcutter

References

External links
 

Wholesalers of the United Kingdom
Retail companies of the United Kingdom
Companies of the United Kingdom
Retail companies established in 1976
Food and drink companies of the United Kingdom
Supermarkets of the United Kingdom
1976 establishments in the United Kingdom
British companies established in 1976
Food and drink companies established in 1976